Events from the year 1997 in the European Union.

Incumbents
 President of the European Council
 Wim Kok (Jan – Jun 1997)
 Jean-Claude Juncker (July – Dec 1997)
 Commission President -  Jacques Santer 
 Council Presidency -  Netherlands (Jan – Jun 1997) and  Luxembourg (July – Dec 1997)

Events
 1 January: Netherlands takes over the Presidency of the European Union.
 1 July: Luxembourg takes over the Presidency of the European Union.

References

 
Years of the 20th century in the European Union
1990s in the European Union